O24 or O-24 may refer to:
 Curtiss O-24, a proposed American observation aircraft
 Dodge O24, an American hatchback
 , a submarine of the Royal Netherlands Navy
 Lee Vining Airport, in Mono County, California, United States
 Oxygen-24, an isotope of oxygen